Stephen Mills (born August 18, 1960 in Morganfield, Kentucky) is an American dancer and choreographer and is currently the Artistic Director/Choreographer at Ballet Austin. Under his tenure, Ballet Austin has been invited on four occasions to perform at the John F. Kennedy Center for the Performing Arts in Washington D.C.

His ballet performances are in the repertories of such companies as The Hong Kong Ballet, American Ballet Theatre Studio Company, The Atlanta Ballet, The Milwaukee Ballet, Washington Ballet, Cuballet in Havana, Cuba, BalletMet Columbus, The Dayton Ballet, The Sarasota Ballet of Florida, Ballet Pacifica, Dallas Black Dance Theater, The Louisville Ballet, The Nashville Ballet, Fort Worth/Dallas Ballet, The Sacramento Ballet and Dance Kaleidoscope.

Career

Early years
Following ten years of study in the Cincinnati Conservatory of Music, Mills started dancing at the age of 18. As a dancer, Stephen Mills performed with a wide variety of companies such as the Harkness Ballet and The American Dance Machine under the direction of Lee Theadore. He also performed with the Cincinnati Ballet and The Indianapolis Ballet Theater before becoming a part of Ballet Austin 1986. Mills has danced principal roles in the George Balanchine repertoire as well as works by Choo-San Goh, John Butler, Ohad Naharin, Vicente Nebrada, Domy Reiter-Soffer and Mark Dendy.

Dance and ballets
Mills choreographed his first work Red Roses to the music of Edith Piaf in 1989 for Ballet Austin. In 1998 Mills was chosen to represent the United States through his work, Ashes, at Les Rencontres Chorégraphiques Internationales de Seine-Saint-Denis in Paris. Mills choreographed several works for Ballet Austin as Resident Choreographer before being named Artistic Director in 2000. As Resident Choreographer he created works such as: A Midsummer Night’s Dream and Cinderella with the music of Alexander Glazunov.

In his inaugural season as artistic director in 2000, Mills released a world-premiere production of Hamlet. He has worked in collaboration with such artists as DJ Spooky on Echo Boom, visual artist Trenton Doyle Hancock on Cult of Color: Call to Color, eight-time Grammy Award-winning band, Asleep at the Wheel on Big Sky, Shawn Colvin, flamenco artist José Greco on Bolero and award-winning Austin composer Graham Reynolds on Bounce, Though the Earth Gives Way, Cult of Color: Call to Color, and Belle REDUX/A Tale of Beauty & the Beast.

Light / The Holocaust and Humanity Project
One of Mills’ most significant works is his original ballet Light / The Holocaust & Humanity Project. This full-length contemporary ballet is one piece of a community wide educational initiative around The Holocaust. The work was imagined as a way for art, specifically dance, to convene a broad conversation about The Holocaust and contemporary issues of genocide and human rights.  According to an archived article by the Huffington Post, “Mills created the confrontational, distinctly contemporary ballet in 2005 after spending 18 months researching the Holocaust, when Germany's Nazi party exterminated more than 6 million Jews during World War II. The ballet is set to contemporary music by Steve Reich, Evelyn Glennie, Michael Gordon, Arvo Part and Philip Glass."

In 2005, Light / The Holocaust and Humanity Project was featured in KLRU's Arts In Context Ballet Austin’s Light / The Holocaust and Humanity Project which won a Lone Star Emmy Award in the Magazine Format Program category. KLRU won a second Lone Star Emmy Award for their segment Producing Light, also depicting Mills’ ballet.

See also
Ballet Austin

References

External links
Stephen Mills Introduction
Ballet Austin's Website

Ballet choreographers
American male ballet dancers
Living people
1960 births